Pestalotiopsis versicolor is a plant pathogen infecting avocados.

References

External links
 USDA ARS Fungal Database

Fungal tree pathogens and diseases
Avocado tree diseases
versicolor